Beautiful Life is the seventh studio album by English-Irish country singer Nathan Carter. It was released in Ireland on 4 May 2015 by Decca Records. The album peaked at number 1 on the Irish Albums Chart and number 34 on the UK Albums Chart. The album includes the singles "On the Boat to Liverpool" and "Good Morning Beautiful".

Singles
"On the Boat to Liverpool" was released as the lead single from the album. The song peaked at number 95 on the Irish Singles Chart. "Good Morning Beautiful" was released as the second single from the album.

Track listing

Charts

Release history

Certifications

References

2015 albums
Nathan Carter albums